Acorigone is a genus of  dwarf spiders that was first described by P. A. V. Borges & J. Wunderlich in 2008.  it contains only two species: A. acoreensis and A. zebraneus, both native to the Azores archipelago.

See also
 List of Linyphiidae species

References

Araneomorphae genera
Endemic arthropods of the Azores
Linyphiidae
Spiders of Macaronesia